Bilikere Srinivasa Rao Dwarakanath (born August 4, 1955) is a molecular biologist and a radiation biologist, working on 2-Deoxy-D-glucose therapy in cancer research. His current research interests are experimental oncology, radiobiology, biological radioprotection and cell signaling in cancer therapy. He is currently the Joint Director of the Institute of Nuclear Medicine and Allied Sciences (INMAS), DRDO, Head, Division of Radiation Biosciences, INMAS, and Adjunct Faculty at the Dr. B. R. Ambedkar Center for Biomedical Research (ACBR), University of Delhi.

He is one of the members of the three-member committee (along with Prof. S.C. Pancholi of the Nuclear Science Centre and Prof. N.C. Goomer of Board of Radiation and Isotope Technology) that was constituted by the Delhi University to probe the incident of radioactivity leakage in a Delhi scrap market, the source of the radioactive material was traced to the Chemistry department of the University.

Early years
Dwarakanath was born in Bangalore, Karnataka, India to B. N. Srinivasa Rao and B. S. Padmavathi as the third among 5 siblings. He obtained his B.Sc. degree in Physics, Chemistry and Mathematics from National College and his M.Sc. degree in Physics from Central College, Bangalore. He obtained his Ph.D. degree from Bangalore University, working at the National Institute of Mental Health and Neurosciences under the radiation biologist Viney K. Jain.

Institute of Nuclear Medicine and Allied Sciences
Dwarakanath joined INMAS, Delhi in April 1994 as "Scientist D". He is currently the Joint Director and HOD, Division of Radiation Biosciences, at INMAS. He has been advocating the use of 2-deoyx-D-glucose as an adjuvant to radiotherapy for the treatment of cancer.

Professional Appointments
 Scientist G, Additional Director and Head, Division of Radiation Biosciences, INMAS, DRDO, Delhi – 2004 to present
 Scientist D, E and Head, Department of Biocybernetics, INMAS – 1994-2004
 Adjunct Faculty, ACBR, University of Delhi – 1999 to present
 Post-doctoral fellow, Bowman Gray School of Medicine, Wake Forest University, Winston-Salem, North Carolina, USA – 1989-1991
 Visiting Scientist, University of Duisburg-Essen, Germany – 1995
 Scientific Assistant, Scientific Officer and Assistant Professor, Department of Biophysics, NIMHANS, Bangalore – 1979-1994

References

1955 births
Living people
Scientists from Bangalore
Bangalore University alumni
Indian molecular biologists
20th-century Indian biologists